Daniel or Dan Ryan may refer to:
 Daniel Ryan (figure skater) (died 1961), American ice dancer who competed with partner Carol Ann Peters
 Daniel Ryan (actor) (born 1968), English actor and writer
 Daniel Ryan Sr., American politician
 Daniel L. Ryan (1930–2015), American prelate of the Roman Catholic Church
 Daniel J. Ryan (1855–1923), Republican politician in Ohio
 Dan Ryan Jr. (1894–1961), American politician
 Dan Ryan (electronic sports player) (born 1986), American electronic sports player
 Daniel Ryan (Tasmanian politician) (1870–1953), Australian politician
 Daniel Joseph Ryan, American politician in the Massachusetts House of Representatives
 Dan Ryan (netball) (born 1984), Australian netball player, coach, sports journalist and broadcaster
 Daniel Ryan (Queensland politician) (1865–1952), member of the Queensland Legislative Assembly
 Dan Ryan (Oregon politician) (born 1962/63), commissioner of Portland, Oregon

See also 
 Dan Ryan branch, section of the Chicago L system
 Dan Ryan Expressway, a Chicago road named after Dan Ryan, Jr
 Dan Ryan Woods, a Chicago forest preserve in South Side, Chicago
Daniel Bryan (born 1981), American wrestler
Daniel Bryan (Virginia politician) (1789–1866), American politician